Simon Richard George Francis (born 15 August 1978) is an English former cricketer, currently Director of Cricket at Warwick School. He bowled right-arm medium-fast and batted right-handed. He made his first-class debut for Hampshire in 1997, making a handful of appearances for the county until he moved to Somerset for the 2002 season. However, appearances for the first XI became less frequent and Francis was released at the end of the 2006 season. He was signed by Nottinghamshire early in the 2007 season, which proved to be his final year in professional cricket.

Francis also toured with England A in India in 2003-04 and appeared in one Youth One-Day International, coming in January 1997 on the England Under-19s' tour of Pakistan. He also represented England at hockey at Under-18 level.

Francis's brother, John, is also a former first-class cricketer, having played similarly for Hampshire and Somerset.

References

External links

1978 births
English cricketers
Hampshire cricketers
Living people
Somerset cricketers
Nottinghamshire cricketers
British Universities cricketers
Alumni of Grey College, Durham